The following is a timeline of the history of the city of Lahore, Pakistan.

Prior to 11th century

 664/682 CE – City besieged by Muslim forces lead by Muhallab ibn Abi Sufra.

11th–15th centuries

 1022 CE – Mahmud of Ghazni ousts Hindu rulers; Malik Ayaz in power.
 1157 – City becomes Muslim Ghaznavid capital.
 1241 – City sacked by Mongols.
 1267 – Lahore Fort rebuilt.

16th–17th centuries

 1524 – Mughal Babur in power.
 1530 – Mir Yunis Ali becomes governor.
 1560 – Masjid Niwin (mosque) built.
 1566 - Lahore Fort built.
 1584 – Mughal Akbar relocates capital to Lahore.
 1622 – Court of Mughal Jehangir established.
 1627
 Khwabgah palace built.
 Tomb of Jahangir built in Shahdara Bagh near city.
 1632 – Shish Mahal (palace) built at Lahore Fort.
 1634 – Wazir Khan Mosque built.
 1635 – Moti Masjid (mosque) built at Lahore Fort.
 1637
 Shalimar Gardens laid out near city.
 
 1649 – Dai Anga Mosque built.
 1673 – Badshahi Mosque built.

18th century

 1739 – City captured by Persian forces under the command of Nader Shah.
 1748 – Ahmed Shah Durrani in power.
 1753 – Sunehri Mosque built in Dubbi Bazaar area.
 1758 – Lahore Fort captured by Maratha forces under Raghunath Rao.
 1759 – Marathas defeat the Durrani Empire in the Battle of Lahore.
 1767 – City under of Sikh rule.
 1779 - Timur Shah Returns to Punjab to Punish the Sikhs (1776-1780)

 1798 – Ranjit Singh in power.
 1799 – Sikh capital relocated from Lahore to Amritsar.

19th century
 1813–1818 – Hazuri Bagh Baradari built.
 1846 – British Council of Regency of the Punjab established.
 1849
 3 January: British East India Company in power.
 Lahore Chronicle newspaper begins publication.
 1850s – Grand Trunk Road Peshawar-Lahore extension constructed (approximate date).
 1858 November 1 – British Crown in power.
 1859 – Masonic Temple built in Anarkali.
 1860
 Amritsar-Lahore train begins operating.
 Lahore Junction railway station built.
 1861 – Lahore Canal built (approximate date).
 1864 – Government College and Rang Mahal School founded.
 1868 – Population: 125,413.
 1872
 Lahore Zoo founded.
 Civil and Military Gazette begins publication.
 1875 – Mayo School of Industrial Art established.
 1880 – Faletti's Hotel in business.
 1881
 Tribune newspaper begins publication.
 Population: 149,369.
 1882 – Punjab University and Lahore Bar Association founded.
 1883 – Central Model School established.
 1884 – Punjab Public Library established.
 1885 – Punjab Civil Secretariat Library founded.
 1886
 Aitchison College founded.
 Khalsa Akhbar Lahore Punjabi-language newspaper begins publication.
 1887
 General Post Office, Lahore built.
 Anglican Cathedral Church of the Resurrection consecrated.
 1889
 Lahore High Court building constructed.
 Railway Technical School established.
 1890 – New town hall built.
 1892 – Punjab Textbook Board Library established.
 1894 – Lahore Museum opens.
 1898 – April: Punjab Assembly passes first law.

20th century
 1901 – Population: 202,964.
 1904 - Sacred Heart Cathedral completed.
 1908 – Dyal Singh Trust Library established.
 1909 – Punjab Chiefs' Association headquartered in city.
 1915 – Lahore Conspiracy Case trial held.
 1921
 Model Town suburb established.
 Mughalpura Technical College founded.
 1924 – Punjab Archival Museum and record office established.
 1928 – Armoury Museum established in Lahore Fort.
 1935 – Punjab Assembly Chamber built.
 1940
 March: City hosts Lahore Resolution proceedings of the All-India Muslim League.
 Nawa-i-Waqt Urdu-language newspaper begins publication.
 1941
 Jamaat-e-Islami Pakistan political party headquartered in city.
 Population: 671,659.

Independence
 1947
 Riots.
 15 August: City becomes part of West Punjab province of Pakistan.
 1948 - Chatan newspaper begins publication.
 1951
 Institute of Islamic Culture established.
 Population: 849,476.
 1952 – Lahore newspaper begins publication.
 1953 – 6 March: Martial Law promulgated in Lahore to control disturbances against Ahmadis.
 1955 – City becomes capital of West Pakistan.
 1959 – Gaddafi Stadium built.
 1964 – 26 November: Pakistan Television Lahore Station inaugurated.
 1965 – Indo-Pakistani War.
 1968 – Minar-e-Pakistan constructed in Iqbal Park.
 1970
 Lahore Stock Exchange founded.
 Pakistan Monitor newspaper begins publication.
 1972 – Population: 2,165,372.
 1974 – City hosts Islamic Summit Conference. Recognized former East Pakistan as Bangladesh. 
 1975 – Lahore Development Authority established.
 1976 – Samjhota Express Amritsar-Lahore train begins operating.
 1977 – Allama Iqbal Museum inaugurated.
 1981
 Minhaj-ul-Quran International (Islamic organization) founded.
 Population: 2,952,689.
 Lahore Zoo Safari established.
 1983 – Ajoka (theatre group) formed.
 1984 – Lahore University of Management Sciences and Lahore Conservation Society established.
 1985 – Punjab Lok Rehas (theatre group) formed.
 1986 – The Nation newspaper begins publication.
 1989 – The Friday Times begins publication.
 1990
 Lahore Drama School and Institute of Leadership and Management founded.
 Daily Pakistan newspaper begins publication.
 February: 1990 Men's Hockey World Cup held.
 1991 – Pearl Mosque built.
 1992 – Alhamra Arts Council building constructed.
 1993 – Zahoor ul Akhlaq Gallery established at the National College of Arts Lahore.
 1996 – Lahore Post begins publication.
 1997 – Lahore-Islamabad Motorway completed.
 1998 – Population: 5,143,495.
 1999
 21 February: City hosts signing of the India-Pakistan Lahore Declaration regarding nuclear armaments.
 University of Lahore established.

21st century
 2001 – Lahore City District divided into nine towns: Aziz Bhatti Town, Data Gunj Bakhsh Town, Gulberg Town, Iqbal Town, Lahore Cantonment, Ravi Town, Samanabad Town, Shalimar Town, Wagah Town.
 2002 – Daily Times begins publication.
 2003
 Allama Iqbal International Airport inaugurated.
 11 July: Delhi-Lahore bus service resumes after suspension of 18 months.
 2006 – Pakistan Fashion Design Council headquartered in city.
 2007
 March: Lawyers' Movement begins.
 DHA Cinema opens.
 Expo Centre Lahore built in Johar Town.
 2009 – Software Technology Park and Alamgir Tower Lahore built.
 2010
 February: PFDC Sunsilk Fashion Week begins.
 28 May: Attacks on Ahmadi mosques.
 1 July: Bombings at Data Durbar Shrine.
 1 September: Bombings.
 Vogue Towers opens.
 Air pollution in Lahore reaches annual mean of 68 PM2.5 and 198 PM10, much higher than recommended.
 2011 – The Lahore Times begins publication.
 2012 – 11 September: Garment factory fire.
 2013
 February: Metrobus (Lahore) begins operating.
 February: Lahore Literary Festival inaugurated.
 March: Anti-Christian riot.
 6 July: Bombing in Old Anarkali district.
 2014 - Grand Jamia Mosque inaugurated.
 2017 - Population: 11,126,285.
 2018 - Pakistan's Supreme Court quashed the conviction (under Blasphemy Law) and ordered the release of 47-year-old Aasia Bibi, a Christian woman from a village in Punjab province who had been on death row for eight years.
 2019
 11 December: Attack on Punjab Institute of Cardiology, Lahore.
 2020
 11 December: The statue of Maharaja Ranjit Singh (placed in Lahore Fort) was vandalized by an extremist who broke the left arm of statue. The man was immediately caught by a security guard and was later on arrested by Lahore Police.
 13 December: Pakistan Democratic Movement (a collation of 11 opposition parties) organized a power show at Minar-e-Pakistan (Greater Iqbal Park, Lahore) against the ruling government of Pakistan Tehreek-e-Insaf.

See also
 History of Lahore
 List of educational institutions in Lahore
 History of the Punjab
 Timelines of other cities in Pakistan: Karachi, Peshawar
 Urbanisation in Pakistan

References

Bibliography

Published in 19th century
 
 
 
 
 
 Thornton, Thomas Henry. A Brief Account of the History and Antiquities of Lahore. Lahore: Government Civil Secretariat Press, 1873.
 
 Kanhaiya Lal. (1884) Tarikh-e-Lahore. Lahore, Pakistan: Aslam Asmat Printers.

Published in 20th century
1900s–1940s
 
 
 
 Lahore and some of its Historical Monuments. Lahore: Superintendent, Government Printing Press, 1927.
 Gulshan Lal Chopra. A Short History of Lahore and its Monuments. Lahore: 1937.
 
1950s–1990s
 
 Lahore Development Authority. Lahore Urban Development and Traffic Study. 5 vols. Lahore, 1980.
 Lahore Development Authority. The Walled City of Lahore. Lahore, 1981.
 Samuel V. Noe. “Old Lahore and Old Delhi: Variations on a Mughal Theme.” Ekistics XLIX (1982), pp. 306–19.
 Mohammed A. Qadeer. Lahore, Urban Development in the Third World. Lahore: Vanguard Books, 1983.
 Ahmad Nabi Khan. “Lahore: the Darus Saltanat of the Moghul Empire under Akbar (1556–1605).” Journal of the Research Society of Pakistan XXI, no.3 (1984), pp. 1–22.
 
 F.S. Aijazuddin. Lahore: Illustrated Views of the 19th Century. Lahore: Vanguard Books, Ltd., 1991.
 
 
 
 Nazir Ahmad Chaudhry. A Short History of Lahore and Some of Its Monuments. Lahore: Sang-e-Meel Publications, 2000.

Published in 21st century
 Journal of Asian Civilizations XXIV, no. 2 (2001). Special issue on Lahore in the Ghaznavid period.
 F.S. Aijazuddin. Lahore Recollected: An Album. Lahore: Sang-e-Meel Publishers, 2003.
 Y. Lari. Lahore – Illustrated City Guide. Karachi, Pakistan: Heritage Foundation Pakistan 2003.
 
 
 Ian Talbot. Divided Cities: Partition and Its aftermath in Lahore and Amritsar, 1947–1957. Karachi: Oxford University Press, 2006.

External links

 
  (photographs)
 Europeana. Items related to Lahore
 British Library. Items related to Lahore
 

Years in Pakistan
.
Lahore
Lahore-related lists
Lahore
Urbanisation in Pakistan
Lahore